The Mălâncrav is a river in Romania, a right tributary of the river Laslea, which it joins upstream from the village of Laslea.

References

Rivers of Romania
Rivers of Sibiu County